The Rheinstadion was a multi-purpose stadium, in Düsseldorf, Germany. The stadium was built, near the Rhine, in 1926 and held 54,000 people at the end of its life.

It was the home ground for Fortuna Düsseldorf from 1953 to 1970 and 1972–2002. It was used during the 1974 FIFA World Cup and 1988 European Championships. In 1995, the Rhein Fire, of the World League of American Football became tenants in their inaugural season. It hosted World Bowl '99 and World Bowl X.

Metallica performed at the stadium during their Nowhere Else to Roam Tour on May 20, 1993, with The Cult & Suicidal Tendencies as their opening act.

It was demolished in the summer of 2002, after the World Bowl X championship game, and has been replaced by the Merkur Spiel-Arena in 2004.

International matches

1974 FIFA World Cup

UEFA Euro 1988

External links
Stadium Guide Article

Fortuna Düsseldorf
1974 FIFA World Cup stadiums
Defunct football venues in Germany
Buildings and structures in Düsseldorf
Multi-purpose stadiums in Germany
Defunct sports venues in Germany
History of Düsseldorf
Sports venues in North Rhine-Westphalia
UEFA Euro 1988 stadiums